Calveley is a surname. Notable people with the surname include:

Grange Calveley (born 1943), British writer and artist
Hugh Calveley (died 1394), English knight and commander
John Calveley, MP for Rutland (UK Parliament constituency)
Mike Calveley (born 1999), English footballer